Paul David Sirba (September 2, 1960 – December 1, 2019) was an American prelate of the Roman Catholic Church who served as bishop of the Diocese of Duluth in Minnesota from 2009 until his death in 2019

Early life and education
Paul Sirba was born on September 2, 1960, in Minneapolis,  Minnesota. He attended Nativity of Mary Catholic School in Bloomington, Minnesota, and later graduated from the Academy of Holy Angels in Richfield, Minnesota. Sirba then went to University of St. Thomas in St. Paul. He completed his studies at the Saint Paul Seminary in Saint Paul, Minnesota and at the Notre Dame Institute for Catechetics in Alexandria, Virginia.

Priesthood
Sirba was ordained a priest May 31, 1986, for the Archdiocese of Saint Paul and Minneapolis. After his ordination, Sirba served as assistant pastor at Saint Olaf Parish in Minneapolis.  In 1990, he was transferred to serve at Saint John the Baptist Parish in Savage, Minnesota, for one year.

Sirba was named spiritual director of the Saint Paul Seminary School of Divinity, holding that position until 2000.  In 2001, he was name pastor of the Maternity of Mary Parish in Saint Paul, Minnesota. Sirba left Maternity of Mary to become director of spiritual formation at Saint Paul school in 2006. He was named vicar general and moderator of the curia for the archdiocese in June 2009.

Bishop of Duluth
On October 15, 2009, Pope Benedict XVI appointed Sirba as bishop of the Diocese of Duluth succeeding Bishop Dennis Schnurr, who was named Coadjutor Archbishop of Cincinnati in October 2008.  Sirba was consecrated on December 14, 2009 by Archbishop John Nienstedt.

On December 1, 2019, Sirba was preparing to celebrate mass at St. Rose Church in Proctor, Minnesota, when he suffered a cardiac arrest.  He died at age 59 at a local hospital.

See also

 Catholic Church hierarchy
 Catholic Church in the United States
 Historical list of the Catholic bishops of the United States
 List of the Catholic bishops of the United States
 Lists of patriarchs, archbishops, and bishops

References

External links 
Roman Catholic Diocese of Duluth Official Site

1960 births
2019 deaths
Clergy from Minneapolis
Roman Catholic Archdiocese of Saint Paul and Minneapolis
Roman Catholic bishops of Duluth
21st-century Roman Catholic bishops in the United States